The sodium–hydrogen antiporter or sodium–proton exchanger (Na+/H+ exchanger) is a membrane protein that transports Na+ into the cell, and H+ out of the cell (antiport).

Function 
They are found in the membranes of many cells, and especially in those of the nephron of the kidney, specifically in the intercalary cells of the collecting duct and in the epithelial cells of the proximal convoluted tubule. The membrane pump is primarily responsible for maintaining homeostasis of pH and sodium. Defects in Na+/H+ antiporters may result in heart or kidney failure. Angiotensin II upregulates this antiporter in the proximal convoluted tubule in order to promote Na+ reabsorption and H+ secretion. Na+/H+ exchangers are thought to be implicated in other disorders such as hypertension. In one study, transgenic mice over expressing this membrane protein were shown to have increased reabsorption and retention of sodium after increased salt intake. 

In dopamine receptor signalling, the widely expressed Na+/H+ exchanger NHE-1 is activated downstream of the D2, D3, and D4 receptors.

Isoforms
There are several isoforms of the antiporter:
Sodium–hydrogen antiporter 1
Sodium–hydrogen antiporter 2
Sodium–hydrogen antiporter 3
Sodium–hydrogen antiporter 4
Sodium–hydrogen antiporter 5
Sodium–hydrogen antiporter 6
Sodium–hydrogen antiporter 7
Sodium–hydrogen antiporter 8
Sodium–hydrogen antiporter 9

Families 
There are several families of sodium/proton antiporters that facilitate the exchange of sodium ions with protons across the lipid membrane. Some of them include:

TC# 2.A.33 - Na+:H+ Antiporter (NhaA) Family
TC# 2.A.34 - Na+:H+ Antiporter (NhaB) Family
TC# 2.A.35 - Na+:H+ Antiporter (NhaC) Family
TC# 2.A.36 - Monovalent Cation:Proton Antiporter-1 (CPA1) Family
TC# 2.A.37 - Monovalent Cation:Proton Antiporter-2 (CPA2) Family
TC# 2.A.62 - Na+:H+ Antiporter (NhaD) Family
TC# 2.A.63 - Monovalent Cation (K+ or Na+):Proton Antiporter-3 (CPA3) Family
TC# 2.A.111 - Na+:H+ Antiporter (NhaE) Family

References

External links 
 

Transport proteins
Transmembrane proteins